Kaijin Akashi was the pen name of Shōtarō Noda (5 July 1901 – 9 June 1939), a Japanese poet whose writing was inspired by his diagnosis of leprosy and confinement to a leper colony.

Early life 
Akashi was born in Numazu, Shizuoka prefecture on 5 July 1901. He was the third son of a farmer. At the age of twenty, he graduated from Shizuoka Normal School with a license to teach elementary school. He worked as a teacher until 1926. In 1924, he married Asako Furugōri, also an elementary school teacher. They had two daughters, born in February 1925 and late 1926.

Leprosy and poetry 
Akashi began to show symptoms of leprosy in early 1926, and was diagnosed that same spring. He retired from teaching after his diagnosis and was soon subjected to the mandatory quarantine regime in practice in Japan at that time. In the following year, he was hospitalized in Akashi Rakusei hospital, which stood in what is now Nishi-ku, Kobe. When this facility closed in 1932, he was moved to the leper colony Nagashima Aiseien Sanatorium.

While at Nagashima Aiseien, Akashi learned to write traditional Japanese poetry, primarily tanka. His poems were published in the sanatorium's magazine, Aisei; and he became one of the best-known of a group of leprosy patients who wrote poetry and prose about their condition, a genre referred to as "leprosy literature" until the 1940s.

Akashi's health deteriorated as a result of his condition, and in autumn of 1936, he went blind. On 11 November 1938, he underwent a tracheotomy as a result of difficulty in breathing. On 9 June 1939, he died at the sanatorium of intestinal tuberculosis.

He published his most successful work, Hakubyō, in 1939, shortly before his death. It sold over 250,000 copies and drew significant attention to the plight of leprosy patients in Japan. Hakubyō was a bittersweet work, exploring Akashi's grief over his condition and the loneliness that stemmed from his lengthy mandated isolation, as well as his eventual view that his condition was a gift enabling him to experience beauty and insight beyond the physical world.

Legacy 
Akashi's work continues to be read and studied by contemporary scholars. Inspired by Akashi's poetry, Japanese photographer Atsushi Fujiwara photographed the decaying remains of Nagashima Aiseien for his 2015 book Poet Island. Four monuments honoring Akashi were erected in his home town of Numazu in 2001.

Books of verse by Akashi 
 (Kaijin ikō). Tokyo: Kaizōsha, 1939. , .
New edition. Tokyo: Ozorasha, 1998. .
 (Hakubyō: Akashi Kaijin kashū). Tokyo: Kaizōsha, 1939. , . (1939)
 (Akaishi Kaijin zenshū). 2 vols. Tokyo: Kaizōsha, 1941. , .
New edition. , et al, eds.  (Kaijin zenshū). 3 vols. Tokyo: Koseisha, 1993. , .
Hiroto Uchida, ed.  (Akaishi Kaijin zenkashū). Tokyo: Tanka-shinbun-sha, 1978. , .
, ed.  (Akashi Kaijin kashū). Tokyo: Iwanami, 2012. .

Notes

References

Further reading 
The Oral History Project - That Spark of Soul Incarnate - Kaijin Akashi, Honami Nagata and Haruko Tsuda
ILEP: Unique Collection of Writings by Japanese Persons Affected by Leprosy
Web page (in Japanese) about Akashi
Mitsuho Ikeda and Hideaki Matsuoka, "Lepers, Nation-State, and Empress Dowager: A Prolegomena to medical anthropology of bio-power governmentality", Ikeda's website (University of Osaka).
Yoshiko Ikeda, "An Epidemic of Emotional Disturbance among Leprosarium Nurses in a Setting of Low Morale and Social Change." Psychiatry: Interpersonal and Biological Processes 29 (1966). .

1901 births
1939 deaths
Waka poets
Japanese male poets
20th-century Japanese poets
Writers from Shizuoka Prefecture
Leprosy in Japan
Deaths from leprosy